The 2011 Faroe Islands Cup was the 57th edition of the Faroe Islands domestic football cup. It started on 26 March 2011 and ended with the final on 8 August 2011. EB/Streymur were the defending champions, having won their third cup title the previous year. The winner of the competition will qualify for the first qualifying round of the 2012–13 UEFA Europa League.

Only the first teams of Faroese football clubs were allowed to participate. The Preliminary Round involved only teams from 1. deild, 2. deild and 3. deild competitions. Teams from the highest division entered the competition in the First Round.

Preliminary round
Entering this round are two clubs from the 1. deild, two clubs from the 2. deild and two clubs from the 3. deild. These matches took place on 26 March 2011. The draw for this round of the competition took place on 7 March 2011.

|}

First round
Entering in this round are the three winners from the Preliminary Round, all ten clubs from the Faroe Islands Premier League and three clubs from the 1. deild. These matches took place on 2 April 2011. The draw for this round of the competition took place on 7 March 2011.

|}

Quarterfinals
Entering this round are the eight winners from the First Round. These matches took place on 4 May 2011.

|}

Semifinals
Entering this round are the four winners from the Quarterfinals. These ties will be played over two legs and will be played on 19 May 2011 and 14 June 2011.

|}

Final

Top goalscorers

References

External links
 Official site 
 soccerandequipment.com
 Faroe Islands Cup on rsssf.com

Faroe Islands Cup seasons
Cup
Faroe Islands Cup